Washington-Wilkes Historical Museum, also known as the Washington Historical Museum, is a historical building in Washington, Georgia. The home was built ca. 1835 by Albert Gallatin Semmes on land owned by American Revolutionary War hero Micajah Williamson. It was added to the National Register of Historic Places on May 13, 1970. It is located at 308 East Robert Toombs Avenue.

See also
National Register of Historic Places listings in Wilkes County, Georgia

References

External links
 Washington Historical Museum - official site

Houses on the National Register of Historic Places in Georgia (U.S. state)
Houses completed in 1835
Museums in Wilkes County, Georgia
Houses in Wilkes County, Georgia
Historic house museums in Georgia (U.S. state)
National Register of Historic Places in Wilkes County, Georgia